Sidi Ahmed Ou Moussa is a small town and rural commune in Tiznit Province of the Souss-Massa-Drâa region of Morocco. At the time of the 2004 census, the commune had a total population of 4,256 people living in 809 households.

See also 

 Sidi Ahmed Ou Moussa (Saint)

References

Rural communes of Souss-Massa
Populated places in Tiznit Province